The Institut Suisse des Sciences Noétiques (Swiss Institute of Noetic Sciences) or ISSNOE is an established public utility nonprofit foundation dedicated to the scientific and comparative study of consciousness. The institute's research focuses on altered states of consciousness (ASC), like near-death experiences (NDEs), extrasensory perceptions (ESPs), and out-of-body experiences (OBEs).

History 

The ISSNOE was created in 2012 from a merger between the Noêsis association and the Foundation Odier de Psycho-Physique (Odier Foundation of Psychophysics). The Noêsis association was formed by Sylvie Dethiollaz, a PhD student in molecular biology, in 1999. The Foundation Odier de Psycho-Physique by Marcel & Monique Odier in 1992, whose team included biologist Rémy Chauvin and physicist Olivier Costa de Beauregard.

Work 
In addition to the Institute's work investigating non-ordinary states of consciousness and near-death experiences, the Institute also focuses on attempting to better understand the fundamental nature of extrasensory perceptions and deciphering distinctive idiosyncrasies which can lead to out-of-body experiences.

The research results are summarized in two books, États Modifiés de Conscience (2011) and Voyage Aux Confins de la Conscience (2018).

Symposia 

ISSNOE members welcome and frequently receive lectures and workshops from researchers, philosophers, physicists, psychologists, and prodromic doctors on their integrative approaches to mourning and the possible survival of the soul and consciousness that survives the death of the physical body.

Lecturers include:

 Dr Piero Calvi-Parizetti, Professor of Emergencies and Humanitarian Action
 Dr , Anaesthetist and intensive care physician
 , Philosopher, sociologist and religion historian
 , former war reporter turned filmmaker and writer
 Dr Olivier Chambon, Psychiatrist and psychotherapist
 Jean-Pierre Postel, Anaesthetist and resuscitator
 , Ethnomusician
 Philippe Guillemant, Physicist
 , Sinologist
 Bernard Werber, Writer

Media Appearances 
The ISSNOE has participated in a range of television broadcasts, including a C8 interview between Dethiollaz and Thierry Ardisson on his weekly talk show, and appearances in programs about OBE on France 2 and France 3. The institute has also been featured in a number of radio broadcasts by Radio Télévision Suisse.

Bibliography 
  First edition in 1934 → . Reprinted in 1940 → 
   Abstract – Summary
  
  Première impression en 2008 en anglais chez Harper Perennial à Toronto , 437 p. , réimpression en 2015 
 Journal of Near-Death Studies
 Journal of Scientific Exploration
 Journal of Abnormal Psychology
 Journal of Consciousness Studies
 Irreducible Mind: Toward a Psychology for the 21st Century
 Life After Life: The Investigation of a Phenomenon—Survival of Bodily Death

Notes and references

Video references

Radio references

Other references

Bibliographical references

External links 

 Institut Suisse des Sciences Noétiques (in French)

See also

Related institutions 

Paranormal organizations
Organisations based in Geneva
Foundations based in Switzerland
International research institutes
Organizations established in 1999
International scientific organizations
Neuroscience research centers in Switzerland
Non-profit organisations based in Switzerland
1999 establishments in Switzerland